Jenmania is a genus of fungi within the family Lichinaceae. The genus contains two species.

The genus name of Jenmania is in honour of George Samuel Jenman (1845-1902), who was a British gardener and botanist.

The genus was circumscribed by Wilhelm Wächter in Flora vol.84 on page 349 in 1897.

References

External links
Jenmania at Index Fungorum

Lichinomycetes
Lichen genera